Agh Mazar-e Kord (also Romanized as Āgh Mazār-e Kord; also known as Āq Mazār) is a village in Bastam Rural District, in the Central District of Chaypareh County, West Azerbaijan Province, Iran. At the 2006 census, its population was 134, in 25 families.

References 

Populated places in Chaypareh County